Lysley A. Tenorio (born Olongapo City, Philippines) is a Filipino-American short story writer.

Lysley Tenorio’s stories have appeared in The Atlantic, Zoetrope: All-Story, Ploughshares, Manoa, and The Best New American Voices and Pushcart Prize anthologies. A Whiting Award winner and a former Stegner Fellow at Stanford University, he has received fellowships from the University of Wisconsin, Phillips Exeter Academy, Yaddo, The MacDowell Colony, and the National Endowment for the Arts.

Born in the Philippines, he lives in San Francisco, and is an associate professor at Saint Mary’s College of California.

He is currently working on a novel.

Awards
 2000 Wallace Stegner Fellow at Stanford University
 2002 The Nelson Algren Award for Short Fiction
 2006 Pushcart Prize for "The Brothers"
 2006 NEA Fellowship 
 2008 Whiting Award
 2013 Edmund White Award
 2014 The Paris Review Writer-In-Residence at The Standard Hotel 
 2015 The Joseph Brodsky Rome Prize, awarded by the American Academy of Arts and Letters

Works
"Help", Ploughshares, Fall 2000  
"Monstress", The Atlantic, June 2003
"Felix Starro", Zoetrope: All-Story, Summer 2009
"L'Amour, CA", The Atlantic, August 2011

Books
 The View from Culion: Stories, University of Oregon, 1998 (Thesis/Dissertation manuscript)
Monstress, Ecco, 2012

Anthologies

References

External links
 Author Website
Profile at The Whiting Foundation
 "Lysley Tenorio", KQED
 "interview with Lysley Tenorio", San Francisco Examiner, July 29, 2009, Alegria Garcia

American short story writers
American writers of Filipino descent
University of Oregon alumni
Living people
Year of birth missing (living people)
People from Olongapo
Filipino emigrants to the United States
American LGBT writers
Stegner Fellows